Water frog may refer to:

 Pelophylax, a genus of frog widespread in Eurasia, with a few species ranging into northern Africa
 Telmatobius, a genus of frog native to the Andean highlands in South America
 Ice frog (Amietia vertebralis), native to southern Africa

Animal common name disambiguation pages